Montenegro competed at the 2022 Mediterranean Games held in Oran, Algeria from 25 June to 6 July 2022.

Medalists

| width="78%" align="left" valign="top" |

Athletics

Montenegro won two medals in athletics.

Men's
Field events

Women's
Field events

Boxing

Montenegro won three medals in boxing.

Judo

Montenegro competed in judo.

Women

Karate

Montenegro won one medal in karate.

Men

Women

Taekwondo

Montenegro competed in Taekwondo.

 Legend
 PTG — Won by Points Gap
 SUP — Won by superiority
 OT — Won on over time (Golden Point)
 DQ — Won by disqualification
 PUN — Won by punitive declaration
 WD — Won by withdrawal

Men

Women

Water polo

Summary

Group play

Semifinal

Final

References

Nations at the 2022 Mediterranean Games
2022
Mediterranean Games